Our Favourite Pop is a pop compilation album by the Japanese musical group paris match.  The album's name and cover art are a homage to the British musical group The Style Council's album Our Favourite Shop.

Track listing
 "Party Down" (Little Beaver)
New release
 "Digging Your Scene" (The Blow Monkeys)
New release
 "(They Long To Be) Close To You" (The Carpenters)
Originally released on the album volume one
 "Never Stop" (The Brand New Heavies)
New release
 "There's Nothing Like This" -featuring Toku- (Omar)
Originally released on the album type III
 "Let's Stay Together" (Al Green)
Originally released on the album ♭5
 "A Woman Needs Love (Just Like You Do)" (Ray Parker Jr.)
New release
 "All Around The World" (Lisa Stansfield)
New release
 "Arthur's Theme (Best That You Can Do)" (Christopher Cross)
Originally released on the album QUATTRO
 "I Want You To Want Me" (Cheap Trick)
New release
 "Feel Like Makin' Love" (Roberta Flack)
Originally released on the album PM2
 "Alison" (Elvis Costello)
New release

　　-Bonus Track-
 "Family Affair" (Sly & The Family Stone) / Jazoulster
Originally released on Jazoulster's album play it cool Vol.1
 "Never Stop" -STALKER STUDIO's sunny house treatment-
New release
 "Family Affair" -M-SWIFT Remix- / Jazoulster
New release

Personnel 

paris match – main performer

2007 compilation albums
Victor Entertainment compilation albums